The Old Gaissert Homeplace, also known as Orr-Williamson-Gaissert Homeplace,  Williamson Place, or Mary Brook Farm, is a historic building in Williamson, Georgia. It was originally built in 1827 and added to the National Register of Historic Places on June 4, 1973. It is located northeast of Williamson on GA 362. The property owners won a 2002 Georgia Centennial Farm Award for family farmers preserving historic properties.

See also
National Register of Historic Places listings in Spalding County, Georgia

References

Houses on the National Register of Historic Places in Georgia (U.S. state)
Farms on the National Register of Historic Places in Georgia (U.S. state)
Houses in Spalding County, Georgia
National Register of Historic Places in Spalding County, Georgia
Century farms